Maniatika is a station on Line 3 of the Athens Metro. The station opened on October 10, 2022 as part of a south extension of the line from Nikaia to Dimotiko Theatro. It serves the areas of Maniatika and Agia Sofia, both neighbourhoods of Piraeus.

History
The station first appeared in the 2000 Athens Metro plan. According to this plan, the station was located on the corner of 25is Martiou and Falirou street, near Agioi Anargyroi church. In the revised 2006 plan the station appeared on its current location, but was named Tambouria. Construction began on July 2012 and was due to be completed in 2017, but it was finally postponed until 2022 due to tunneling problems caused by the existence of caves in the area. The TBM arrived at Maniatika on March 22, 2017.

Entrances
The station's sole entrance is located on the corner of Aitolikou and Mavromichali street in Maniatika, Piraeus. The station is fully ADA accessible

Controversy and Construction Problems
During the construction of the station, there was a strong opposition by local residents. This was due to the closing of public streets and the demolition of certain buildings in order for the station to be constructed. This opposition was mainly centered around the "To Metro Skotonei ta Maniatika" ("Metro kills Maniatika") facebook page.During the construction of the tunnel between Nikaia and Maniatika there was a large number of caves discovered. The caves were filled with cement, but caused the tunneling process to slow down. This was ultimately the reason that led the delivery of the station to be delayed.

Gallery

References

External links

Maniatika station construction videos

Athens Metro stations
Railway stations opened in 2022
2022 establishments in Greece